Sharmeh Kola (also Romanized as Sharmeh Kolā) is a village in Khoshk Rud Rural District, Rudbast District, Babolsar County, Mazandaran Province, Iran. At the 2006 census, its population was 369, in 93 families.

References 

Populated places in Babolsar County